Varig Flight 810 was a scheduled international passenger flight from Rio de Janeiro to Los Angeles with stopovers in Lima, Bogotá, Panama City, and Mexico City. On 27 November 1962 the Boeing 707-441 operating the route crashed into a mountain on approach to Lima, killing all 97 passengers and crew. At the time it was the deadliest aviation accident in Peru until being surpassed by LANSA Flight 502 in 1971 and later Faucett Perú Flight 251 in 1996.

Aircraft 
The aircraft involved in the accident was a Boeing 707-441 equipped with four Rolls-Royce Conway 508 engines, registered PP-VJB to Varig. At the time of the accident, the aircraft was two years old and sustained 6,326 flight hours; its certificate of airworthiness (CofA) was issued 12 September 1962 and was due to expire on 22 May 1963.

Crew 
Due to having two crew on board, 17 crew members were aboard the flight, of which eight were cockpit crew. The cockpit crews consisted of:
 Captains Gilberto Salomoni and Edu Michel
 Co-pilots Frederico Helmut Hirschmann and Gaspar Balthazar Ferrario
 Flight engineers Leonardo Nunhofer and Armindo Ferreira Maciel
 Radio operators Besmar Lino dos Reis and Francisco Evangelista Oliveira
All crew members were citizens of Brazil except for two stewardesses.

Synopsis 
At 03:43 UTC the flight departed from Rio en route to Lima carrying 80 passengers and 17 crew members. The flight passed Pirassununga at 04:30, Campo Grande at 05:24, Corumbá at 05:48, Santa Cruz at 06:30, Cochabamba at 06:52, Charaña at 07:15, and Pisco at 08:13. At 08:14, one minute after passing Pisco, the Boeing 707 started descent, reporting at 08:19 to be at an altitude of 26,000 feet.

Shortly thereafter the flight was granted authorization for a straight-in approach to runway 33. Because the flight was at too high for a straight-in approach to runway 33, ATC suggested rotating 360° over the point of Las Palmas to lose enough altitude for an approach and report again when the turn was completed. The flight continued descending then turned slightly right from its 330° heading, passing east of the airport before making a left turn and passing over the airport.

The flight continued the turn until it was heading south, passing the west of Las Palmas in order to initiate the procedure from the ILS course, then finally made a 180° turn to reach the ILS back course, at a heading of 327°.  The flight stayed on the standard intercept course for nearly three minutes until before initiating the turn North.  The heading of the flight was 333° when it crashed into the Laz Cruz Peak, eight miles east from the approach track for the planned ILS course. Communications with ATC ceased at 08:37, and an emergency was declared at 08:55.

The wreckage of the Boeing 707 was found at 18:00 by the Peruvian Air Force. The impact of the crash and explosion from the crash completely destroyed the aircraft, killing all 80 passengers and 17 crew members. Visibility at the time of the accident was reported to be .

Conclusions 
The aircraft was determined to be flying normally at impact; at the time of impact the engines were operating at approach power. No one cause to the accident could be proven conclusively, but several theories have arisen. The flight time for the 113 mile distance between Pisco and Lima was listed as 23 minutes on the flight plan, when in reality the average flying time reported by other airlines was closer to 16 minutes. The overestimate of time by seven minutes resulted in the aircraft's excessive altitude when arriving at Lima. Analysis of data suggested it was possible that the pilot incorrectly tuned to the Limatambo Non-directional radio beacon in the belief it was for LIM 335. There was also a possibility that the navigation equipment was giving the flight crew inaccurate information, or a malfunction of the automatic direction finder causing the flight crew to believe the ILS was not functioning.

The probable cause of the accident was cited as follows:"A deviation, for reasons unknown, from the track prescribed for the instrument approach along the ILS back course of Lima-Callao Airport."

See also 
 Avianca Flight 410
 Air Inter Flight 148
 Pakistan International Airlines Flight 268
 American Airlines Flight 965

References 

Aviation accidents and incidents in 1962
Aviation accidents and incidents in Peru
810
1962 in Peru 
Accidents and incidents involving the Boeing 707
November 1962 events in South America
Airliner accidents and incidents involving controlled flight into terrain
1962 disasters in Peru